Johny Aala Re is a Hindi comedy show on Zee TV hosted and produced by famous Indian comedian, Johnny Lever.

Concept
The show consists of various segments, some permanent and some that keep changing to have you guessing and asking for more.

Segment 1
Stand up by Johnny (Topical)

Segment 2
Gags (funny skits by a set of actors)/ Johnny in disguise

Segment 3
Main Bhi Johnny- a contest wherein a video booth will be taken out on the streets to invite the common man to showcase his talent. One winner from 3 final contestants will be called on stage to perform.

Segment 4
Slice of Life- (Johnny interviews the common man/ celebrities wherein they showcase their talents)

Segment 5
Picturized gag leading into a parody (Johny dancing on re-recorded songs with funny lyrics incorporated in funny situations)

References

External links
 Official Site
 Johny Aala Re on Sifymax.com

2006 Indian television series debuts
2006 Indian television series endings
Indian comedy television series
Zee TV original programming